Acronicta barnesii is a moth of the family Noctuidae. It is found in North America.

The wingspan is about 40 mm.

References

External links
Image
ITIS

Acronicta
Moths of North America
Moths described in 1897